Derwen College is a specialist college situated in Gobowen near Oswestry in Shropshire in the United Kingdom. 

Derwen College offers residential and day placements to students aged 16–25 with special educational needs and disabilities (SEND), including:

 Learning and physical disabilities
 Autism
 Behaviours of concern
 Profound and Multiple Learning Disabilities 

Derwen has its main campus in Gobowen, near Oswestry, and also three satellite sites across Shropshire at: Ludlow, Telford and Walford (near Shrewsbury).

The college is rated as 'Good' by Ofsted.  Derwen College is also rated as 'Good' by CQC.

Visiting Derwen College's Marketplace 
Derwen College Marketplace in Gobowen is a unique setting where Derwen College students undertake work placements in a range of customer facing outlets to gain vocational work skills.

By undertaking work placements (in the restaurant, cafes, charity shop, hotel and garden centre), students learn key skills through real-life experience.

Work placements enable students to learn essential vocational skills for life including customer service, retail and hospitality skills.

In the latest inspection report, Ofsted said:

Leaders prepare realistic work placements for learners within the college campuses. For example, learners will work in the Garden Café, The Vintage Advantage charity shop, Hotel 751 and the extensive gardens. Learners develop industry-standard skills, which help them to find employment on leaving the college.

This is only possible through your support of Derwen Marketplace.

Awards

Derwen College has received a number of awards including:

2022

The Innovation Award - Charity Retail Awards

Queen’s Award for Enterprise – Promoting Opportunity

Natspec Award 2022 – Pathways into Employment

Aico Awards 2022 – College Initiative of the Year (for the Vintage Advantage launch)

2021

NASEN (National Association for Special Educational Needs) Award – Best aged 16-25 provision in the UK.

Awarded TES FE Awards Specialist provider of the year.

Pearson Teaching Awards 2021 – Gold award for Steve Evans in Specialist Teacher of the Year category.

References

External links 
Derwen College site
Derwen Marketplace - Garden Centre & Gift Shop, The Vintage Advantage Charity Shop and Walled Garden Cafe
Archive site
Natspec site
Dame Agnes Hunt, who also founded the Robert Jones and Agnes Hunt Orthopeadic Hospital, in Gobowen, Oswestry.

Further education colleges in Shropshire
Learning and Skills Beacons
Educational institutions established in 1927
1927 establishments in England